The 5th constituency of the Saône-et-Loire is a French legislative constituency in the Saône-et-Loire département.

Description

The 5th constituency of the Saône-et-Loire covers the centre of the department and includes the majority of Chalon-sur-Saône as well as the town of Montceau-les-Mines noted for its now closed coal mines. Montceau-les-Mines was only added to the seat following the 2010 redistricting of French legislative constituencies.

In 2002, Dominique Perben  is appointed Minister, and is replaced by his substitute, Dominique Juillot.

The seat was won by Christophe Sirugue of the PS in 2007 ending 19 years of conservative control.

Historic Representation

Election results

2022

 
 
|-
| colspan="8" bgcolor="#E9E9E9"|
|-

2017

 
 
 
 
 
 
 
|-
| colspan="8" bgcolor="#E9E9E9"|
|-

2012

 
 
 
 
 
 
|-
| colspan="8" bgcolor="#E9E9E9"|
|-

Sources

 Official results of French elections from 2002: "Résultats électoraux officiels en France" (in French).

5